"Beware My Cheating Bart" is the eighteenth episode of the twenty-third season of the American animated television series The Simpsons. It originally aired on the Fox network in the United States on April 15, 2012. The title refers to the song "Be Still My Beating Heart" by Sting.

Plot
During a day out in the mall, Homer decides to dump Milhouse and Bart at a children's movie so he can eat at the food court. The boys run into the bullies (who are there to see an R-rated remake of a Hong Kong horror film called "Crawlspace") and Bart is forced to chaperone Jimbo Jones' girlfriend Shauna while she sees a Jennifer Aniston movie. Both of them leave shortly after seeing the only part of the movie that appeals to Shauna (the man's ass) and they hang out in the mall. Bart covers for Shauna when she shoplifts and when they escape from an incompetent mall cop, Shauna says that Bart is pretty cool and shows her appreciation by flashing her breasts in front of him, leaving him both traumatized and smitten with her. Both decide to enter a romantic relationship behind Jimbo's back, but he figures out what's going on soon afterwards. Both attempt to hide from a vengeful Jimbo at Comic Book Guy's store, while the bully decides to stake out Bart's home with help from an oblivious Marge, leaving Bart to come home and face Jimbo's wrath. Shauna breaks up with both of them after some good advice from Lisa, and Bart receives his punishment (being held upside down from his treehouse to have the "fear of God put into him") from Jimbo.

Meanwhile, Homer is persuaded to buy a state-of-the-art treadmill from a crafty salesman. When Lisa shows Homer that he can access television shows wirelessly, he takes advantage of the machine and develops an obsession with watching an old television show called Stranded, instead of working out. Eventually Marge, in a fit of rage, gives away all the spoilers of the episodes Homer has not watched yet. He is initially furious at Marge and hints at their marriage failing, but a romantic evening planned by her resolves matters.

Reception
The episode originally aired on the Fox network in the United States on April 15, 2012. It was watched by approximately 4.864 million people during this broadcast.

Rowan Kaiser of The A.V. Club gave the episode a C+, praising the couch gag "in an episode that was anything but memorable otherwise".

Chalkboard gag
Different chalkboard gags appeared for different airings of this episode. The original U.S. broadcast version was "The true location of Springfield is in any state but yours", a response to reactions to a Matt Groening interview in which he revealed that the name of Springfield was inspired by Springfield, Oregon, which was widely misinterpreted as Groening revealing that The Simpsons Springfield was located in Oregon.

On Disney+, the chalkboard gag reads "Teacher does not have to pay an ugly tax".

References

External links 
 
 "Beware My Cheating Bart" at theSimpsons.com

The Simpsons (season 23) episodes
2012 American television episodes